Alexis Diaz (born October 5, 1968) is a former Major League Baseball outfielder. He played all or parts of eight seasons in the majors, from  until , for the Milwaukee Brewers, Seattle Mariners, Texas Rangers, San Francisco Giants and Houston Astros. His most substantial major league action was in 1995 with the Mariners, when he started in center field due to an injury to Ken Griffey Jr.

External links

1968 births
Living people
Algodoneros de Unión Laguna players
American expatriate baseball players in Mexico
Columbia Mets players
Denver Zephyrs players
Fresno Grizzlies players
Guerreros de Oaxaca players
Houston Astros players
Indianapolis Indians players
Jackson Mets players
Kingsport Mets players
Little Falls Mets players
Major League Baseball outfielders
Mexican League baseball center fielders
Milwaukee Brewers players
New Orleans Zephyrs players
Norfolk Tides players
Oklahoma City 89ers players
San Francisco Giants players
Seattle Mariners players
Sportspeople from Brooklyn
Baseball players from New York City
St. George Pioneerzz players
St. Lucie Mets players
Tacoma Rainiers players
Texas Rangers players
Tidewater Tides players